7W or 7-W may refer to:

Units of measurement
7°W, or 7th meridian west, a longitude coordinate
7 watts
7 weeks
7 wins, abbreviated in a Win–loss record (pitching)

Transportation
7W, IATA code for Wind Rose Aviation
Ford 7W a passenger car built in the UK in the 1930s
Spartan 7W Executive, a model of Spartan Executive aircraft

See also
W7 (disambiguation)